Leena Häkinen (1928–1990) was a Finnish stage, film and television actress.

Selected filmography
 Sleeping Beauty (1949)
 The General's Fiancée (1951)
 Tweet, Tweet (1958)

References

Bibliography 
 Ritva Heikkilä. Suomen kansallisteatteri: The Finnish national theatre. W. Söderström, 1972.

External links 
 

1928 births
1990 deaths
Actresses from Helsinki
Finnish stage actresses
Finnish film actresses
Finnish television actresses